Origins Vol. 2 is the seventh studio album by American guitarist Ace Frehley, released on September 18, 2020. The album was announced on July 4, 2020. It is a covers album which features guest appearances from Lita Ford, John 5, Robin Zander, Rob Sabino and former Kiss guitarist Bruce Kulick. It is the sequel to Frehley's 2016 covers album, Origins Vol. 1.

Track listing

Personnel

Musicians
 Ace Frehley – vocals , guitars , bass , 
 Jeremy Ashbrock – guitars , vocals 
 Ryan Spencer Cook – guitars and vocals 
 Lara Cove – backing vocals 
 Lita Ford – vocals 
 John 5 – guitars 
 Bruce Kulick – guitars 
 Rob Sabino - organ 
 Alex Salzman – bass , guitars 
 Philip Shouse – bass, guitars, and vocals 
 Paul Simmons – drums 
 Matt Starr – drums , percussion 
 Robin Zander – vocals 

Production
 Ace Frehley – producer
 Alex Salzman – co-producer, engineer
 Michael Everett – additional engineering 
 Tim Brennan – engineer 
 Ronnie Mancuso – lead vocal engineering 
 Anthony Focx – mixing, mastering
 Marti Frederiksen – mixing

Charts

References

2020 albums
Ace Frehley albums
Covers albums